Sir Jonathan Mark Swift (born 11 September 1964) is a British High Court judge. 

Swift was born in Rochford, England and was educated at Southend High School for Boys. He studied at New College, Oxford and completed a BA in 1987. He followed this with an LLM at Emmanuel College, Cambridge in 1988. 

He was called to the bar at Inner Temple in 1989 and practised from 11 King's Bench Walk. He was First Treasury Counsel from 2007 to 2014 and took silk in 2010. He served as a recorder from 2010 to 2018 and was appointed deputy High Court judge in 2016.

On 1 October 2018, Swift was appointed a judge of the High Court and assigned to the Queen's Bench Division. He took the customary knighthood in the same year. Since 2020, he has been judge in charge of the Administrative Court.

In 2008, he married Helen Evans with whom he has a son and a daughter.

On 10 June 2022, he ruled deportation flights of unsuccessful asylum seekers in the UK to Rwanda should be allowed to proceed as there was material public interest in doing so. He further said that the risks posed to refugees was "in the realms of speculation".

References 

Living people
1964 births
21st-century English judges
Knights Bachelor
Alumni of Emmanuel College, Cambridge
Alumni of New College, Oxford
Members of the Inner Temple
People educated at Southend High School for Boys
Queen's Bench Division judges
English King's Counsel
21st-century King's Counsel